Life Goes On is the debut Japanese studio album by South Korean singer Onew. It was physically released on July 6, 2022, through EMI Records. The album consists of two parts, Who Sings? Vol.1 and Life Goes On, which were digitally released on June 1, 2022, and June 29, 2022, respectively. It contains 10 tracks, including six original songs and four covers with the lead single of the same name.

Background and release
Onew released his second EP in April 2022 after taking a four-year hiatus from his solo music career due to military service. Following this, it was announced that he would release his first Japanese album in July, accompanied by his first Japan concert tour as a soloist.
 
The album contains two discs; the first disc includes six original songs, while the second includes four covers of famous Japanese songs. The bonus disc was released as a digital EP titled Who Sings? Vol.1 on June 1. The songs included are "Everything" by Misia, "Kirakira" by Kazumasa Oda, "Uroko" by Motohiro Hata and "Yasashii Kiss o Shite" by Dreams Come True. "Kirakira" and "Uroko" were released on digital music platforms on May 18 and May 25, respectively. The music video for "Kirakira" stars Rena Takeda and Jin Suzuki and showcases a story about everyday life. The album's title song "Life Goes On" was pre-released on June 22. The album's second disc was digitally released on June 29. The full studio album was released physically on July 6 along with the music video of the title track starring Hinako Sakurai and was shot in Okinawa.

Promotion
To commemorate the album's release, Onew held a talk event in collaboration with J-Wave in front of 400 fans, where he discussed the production process. He hosted the July 7 episode of All Night Nippon. Onew embarked on his first Japanese concert tour on July 8 in support of the album. A reality show depicting his album preparations titled Hello Onew was broadcast by Fuji TV on July 11. He also collaborated with YouTuber and vocal coach Ryo Shiraishi appearing on his YouTube channel discussing his singing techniques and Japanese debut album.

Commercial performance
Following their digital releases both Who Sings? Vol.1 and Life Goes On topped Oricon's Weekly Digital chart, peaked at number four on the Billboard Japan Hot Albums chart and topped the component Download Albums chart, recording 3,254 and 2,108 respectively.  With its physical release, Life Goes On recorded 30,299 copies in first week sales.

Track listing

Charts

Weekly charts

Monthly charts

Year-end charts

Release history

References

2022 albums
Japanese-language albums
Onew albums
EMI Records albums